John Spelman may refer to:

 Sir John Spelman (historian) (1594–1643), English historian and politician, MP for Worcester
 Sir John Spelman (judge) (died 1546), English judge
 John Spelman (MP for Castle Rising) (1606–1663), English politician

See also
 John Spellman (1926–2018), American politician